The Governor is a 1977 New Zealand docudrama television miniseries on Sir George Grey, co-produced by Television One and the National Film Unit, with Grey played by English actor Corin Redgrave. There are six parts, screened from Sunday 2 October 1977; the series has not been rescreened as TV One omitted to obtain repeat rights.

The series is about Sir George Grey as Governor of New Zealand from 1845–53 and 1861–68. In the nineteenth century he was both Governor and (later) Prime Minister of New Zealand, and Governor of South Australia and Governor of the Cape Colony. Neville describes him as “a Victorian gentleman, a drug addict (he used laudanum) and a lecher”. The cost (with over-runs) was $1 million, and Prime Minister Rob Muldoon instigated an investigation by the parliamentary public expenditure committee into budgeting and the control of expenditure in television. The series also aroused controversy because of the emphasis on Grey's private life, and the dialogue in the Māori language, often without subtitles.

Keith Aberdein wrote the script, from an idea by Michael A. Noonan, and carried out his own historical research and interviews. The series was produced by Tony Isaac. It won the 1978 Feltex Award for best drama, and Episode 4 won the award for best script.

Episodes 
 The Reverend Traitor: Grey and the missionary Henry Williams (Grant Tilly)
 No Way to treat a Lady: Grey and his wife Eliza (Judy Cleine)
 The Mutinous Lieutenant: Grey and Edward John Eyre (Jeremy Stephens)
 He Iwi Tahi Tatou (now we are one people): Grey and Wiremu Tamihana (Don Selwyn)
 The Lame Seagull: Grey's war with British general Sir Duncan Cameron (Martyn Sanderson).
 To the Death: Grey in the Mansion House on Kawau Island, looking back

References 
Good Governor Grey by Hugh Neville in the New Zealand Listener of 1 October 1977; Volume 87 number 1971, pages 38–39.
The Governor by Keith Aberdein (1977, Hamlet Books, Wellington)

External links 
The Governor on the Film Archives website
Episode 1; The Reverend Traitor online (go down list of films on left) at NZ On Screen

1970s New Zealand television series
1970s television miniseries
1977 New Zealand television series debuts
1977 in New Zealand television
1977 New Zealand television series endings
Docudrama television series
English-language television shows
Historical television series
New Zealand drama television series
New Zealand television miniseries
New Zealand Wars in popular culture
Television shows set in New Zealand
Television series set in the 1830s
Television series set in the 1840s
Television series set in the 1850s
Television series set in the 1860s
TVNZ 1 original programming
National Film Unit